The 114th Brigade was an infantry brigade formation of the British Army during the First World War. It was raised as part of the new army also known as Kitchener's Army and assigned to the 38th (Welsh) Division. 

The brigade reformed in the Second World War as the 113th Infantry Brigade, formed as a 2nd Line duplicate of 160th Infantry Brigade.

First World War formation
The infantry battalions did not all serve at once, but all were assigned to the brigade during the war.
 10th (Service) Battalion (1st Rhondda), Welsh Regiment
 13th (Service) Battalion (2nd Rhondda), Welsh Regiment
 14th (Service) Battalion (Swansea), Welsh Regiment
 15th (Service) Battalion (Carmarthenshire County Committee), Welsh Regiment
 114th Machine Gun Company
 114th Trench Mortar Battery

Second World War
 5th Battalion, King's Shropshire Light Infantry
 1st Brecknockshire Battalion, South Wales Borderers
 2nd Battalion, Herefordshire Regiment
 114th Infantry Brigade Anti-Tank Company (formed 10 July 1940, disbanded 9 January 1942)

References

Sources
 

Infantry brigades of the British Army in World War I
Infantry brigades of the British Army in World War II
B114